This is a list of festivals and events in the U.S. state of Tulsa, Oklahoma:

Cultural
 Black Buggy Day - September, just east of Tulsa in Choteau
 Brookside ARTZZ - Peoria in September 23; jazz and art
 ChristKindlMarkt
 Conestoga - literary science fiction and fantasy convention held every July
 Festival Hispano - September
 Greek Holiday Festival
 Green Country Eco-Expo & One Love Music Fest
 Harvest Moon Festival - arts, crafts, gifts, and food; October 
 I AM Yoga, Art + Music Festival - September
 Jenks Art On Main - October
 Oklahoma Chautauqua - historical tourism; free to the public; held each June on the campus of OSU-Tulsa
 Oklahoma Indian Summer Festival - September, just north of Tulsa in Bartlesville
 Pow-wow of Champions
 SCOTFEST - third weekend of every September
 ShalomFest
 Tokyo, OK (formerly Tokyo in Tulsa) - anime convention held every July
 Tulsa Indian Art Festival
 Tulsa Oktoberfest
 Tulsa Pride Festival 
 Utsav India Fest - September, at the Pavilion at Expo Square

Film
 BareBones International Independent Film and Music Festival
 Tulsa Overground Film and Music Festival
 Tulsa United Film Festival

Music
 Backwoods Bash Music and Camping Festival - Stroud, Oklahoma, halfway between Tulsa and Oklahoma City
 Bluegrass and Chili Festival
 Brookside ARTZZ - Peoria; September; jazz and art
 CrawFest - held annually on the Saturday following Mothers' Day in May; Cajun cuisine and music
 Diversafest Music Conference & Festival (now defunct)
 EvoFest Music, Crafts, and Sustainability Festival - May
 Fall Fest - Flyin' W Ranch in Broken Arrow, Oklahoma; second weekend in November
 Free Tulsa Music Festival - outdoor music event in Downtown Tulsa 
 Hound Dog Blues Festival - in west Tulsa's Chandler Park, in September
 Jazz on Greenwood Festival
 Juneteenth Blues and Jazz Festival
 Reggaefest Green Country Eco-Expo & One Love Music Fest - July, at Jenks Riverwalk Crossing
 Rock n' Rib Festival - hosted by the BOK Center; September
 Wunderfest - multiple stages for music; arts; food; August; River West Festival Park in Tulsa

Seasonal

 Blue Dome Arts Festival - May
 Brush Creek Bazaar - October 11–13
 Castle Christmas - at the Castle of Muskogee; features over 2000 holiday inflatables; open Thanksgiving through New Year's Eve, 6pm-10pm
 ChristKindlMarkt - first weekend in December
 Christmas light display - Rhema Bible Church in Broken Arrow, Oklahoma, featuring over a million lights and props
 During Tulsa Summers
 Fall Fest at the Flyin' W Ranch in Broken Arrow, Oklahoma - second weekend in November
 Gay Pride - in June, sponsored by Oklahomans for Equality 
 Halloween Festival - at the Castle of Muskogee; every Friday and Saturday in October
 MayFest - May
 Oklahoma Renaissance Festival - at the Castle of Muskogee; every weekend in May
 Oktoberfest - October
 PSO Christmas Parade of Lights
 Psycho Path Haunted Attraction - 40 acres; Dark Ride; Shadow Box
 Wunderfest Wunderfest - annual music, arts and food festival in August
 Tulsa State Fair - end of September

Food
Many of the cultural and seasonal events feature a variety of specialty foods, such as ethnic foods of German and Scottish origin.
 Art of BBQ - downtown Tulsa, in September
 ChristKindlMarkt - bratwurst, strudel
 Food Truck Festival - Tulsa's Air and Space Museum - September
 Harvest Beer Festival - downtown Tulsa, in September
 Rock n' Rib Festival - hosted by the BOK Center; September
 First Draft Craft Beer Tasting - hosted by Tulsa Press Club - November

Other notable food-specific events in Tulsa and the surrounding area include:

 Bixby Corn Festival - Bixby, Oklahoma
 Porter Peach Festival - Porter, Oklahoma

External links
 Local food festivals: tulsafood.com
 Oklahoma Tourism's guide to Oklahoma festivals: travelok.com
 Local art festivals: tulsaartspot.com
 Festivals in Tulsa: dowhattulsa.com

Festivals and events in Tulsa, Oklahoma
Tulsa
Tulsa, Oklahoma